Çıraqlı (also, Chiragly, Chirakhly, and Chyragly) is a village and municipality in the Shamakhi Rayon of Azerbaijan.  It has a population of 242.

References 

Populated places in Shamakhi District